The Gonzaga Bulldogs women's basketball  is the college basketball program representing Gonzaga University. The school competes in the West Coast Conference in Division I of the National Collegiate Athletic Association (NCAA). The Bulldogs play home basketball games at the McCarthey Athletic Center in Spokane, Washington on the university campus.

History
Gonzaga began play in 1987. They have appeared in the NCAA Tournament in 2007, 2009, 2010, 2011, 2012, 2013, 2014, 2015, and 2017. They made the Second Round in 2009, 2010, 2011, 2012, 2015. They made the Sweet Sixteen in 2010, 2011, 2012, and 2015. They made the Elite Eight in 2011. They have made the WNIT in 1994, 2004, 2005, 2008, and 2016. They have won the WCC Tournament title in 2007, 2009, 2010, 2011, 2013, 2014, and 2017. They have won the regular season title in 1988, 2005, 2006 (shared), 2007, 2008, 2009, 2010, 2011, 2012, 2013, 2014, 2015 and 2017. As of the end of the 2016–17 season, the Bulldogs have an all-time record of 507–389.

NCAA tournament results
Gonzaga has appeared in 12	NCAA Tournaments, with a record of 11–12.

Retired numbers 

Gonzaga has retired one number.

References

External links